The Lost body Hypothesis tries to explain the empty tomb of Jesus by a naturally occurring event, not by resurrection, fraud, theft or coma. Only the Gospel of Matthew (28:2) mentions a 'great earthquake' on the day of Jesus' resurrection. The preceding crucifixion quake was accompanied by darkness, splitting of the rock and opening of graves (Matthew 27:51). In this way, a crack in the rock is purported to explain the empty tomb on resurrection day; the body of Jesus fell into a crevice produced by the earthquake and the crack closed again because of the aftershocks.

The Gospel of Matthew in this theory is seen to be hinting at the earthquake events in verse 12:40: the Son of Man descending for three days in the heart of the earth, like Jonah was in the whale's belly. The Gospels of Mark and Luke do not mention a quake, but only darkness at noon, splitting of the temple veil and the tombstone rolled away. John in his Gospel (12:24) and Paul in his Letters (1 Corinthians 15:36) used the image of a grain of wheat falling in the earth for the event of death and resurrection of Jesus.

18th century
According to the radical German rationalist and spiritualist  in his Confession of Faith (1746) the Matthean earthquake had buried the body and therefore it was lost. Edelmann combined his lost body hypothesis with a spiritual view on Jesus' resurrection:

20th century
The Austrian spiritualist, R.J.L. Steiner, in his article, The Fifth Gospel (1913), described what his "clairvoyant consciousness" saw as an earthquake that hid the body of Jesus:

In 1925, German theologist R. Seeberg seems to have entertained a lost body hypothesis as a possibility in his  (Allison).

Historicity of the Matthean earthquake
The church father Origen has interpreted the Matthean earthquake as a historical but local, Judean phenomenon. A widespread 6.3 magnitude earthquake has been confirmed to have taken place between 26 and 36 AD in the time of Jesus. The authors concluded that:

See also

 Vision hypothesis
 Stolen body hypothesis
 Swoon hypothesis
 Historical Jesus
 Historicity of Jesus
 Religious perspectives on Jesus

References

Historicity and origin of the Resurrection of Jesus
Earthquake myths
1st-century earthquakes
Earthquakes in Israel